Artiles is a surname. Notable people with the surname include:

Aythami Artiles (born 1986), Spanish footballer 
Frank Artiles (born 1973), American politician 
Gabriel Izquier Artiles (born 1993), Spanish footballer
José Artiles (born 1993), Spanish footballer